Keshada Mahanta (17 September 1937 – 26 March 2018) was an Indian writer of Assamese literature. She was awarded a Sahitya Akademi Award in 2010 for her work Assamese Ramayani Sahitya: The Origin of Content.

References 

1937 births
2018 deaths
Indian writers